Shawnigan Lake may refer to:

Shawnigan Lake (British Columbia), a lake on Vancouver Island, Canada
Shawnigan Lake, British Columbia, a village in the Cowichan Valley Regional District, Canada